Liliʻuokalani was the first queen regnant and the last sovereign monarch of the Kingdom of Hawaiʻi. The queen ascended to the throne on January 29, 1891, nine days after the death of her brother Kalākaua, and inherited his cabinet ministers. The four cabinet positions were Attorney General, Minister of Finance,  Minister of Foreign Affairs and Minister of the Interior. The ministers were ex-officio members of the House of Nobles in the legislature and the Privy Council of State, a larger body of advisors. 

The Bayonet Constitution that Kalākaua had been compelled to sign in 1887 allowed the monarch to appoint the cabinet, but transferred the power of their removal to the legislature alone. A legislative "resolution of want of confidence" would force the resignation of an entire cabinet. The new law allowed non-residents to vote, but economic and literacy restrictions disenfranchised a majority of  Asians and native Hawaiians. After her brother's funeral, the queen demanded the resignations of his ministers, causing a legal challenge when they refused. The case was decided in her favor by the Supreme Court of the kingdom.

Shortly after her accession, Liliʻuokalani began to receive petitions through the political party Hui Kālaiʻāina and the National Reform Party to re-write the constitution. The proposed constitution co-written by the queen and two legislators, Joseph Nāwahī and William Pūnohu White, would have restored the power to the monarchy, and voting rights to the disenfranchised population. 

Attorney General Arthur P. Peterson, Minister of Finance William H. Cornwell, Minister of Foreign Affairs Samuel Parker and Minister of the Interior John F. Colburn were specifically appointed on January 13, 1893, because the queen believed they would support her promulgation of a new constitution, but they refused to sign the document. On January 17, 1893, the Kingdom of Hawaii fell to a coup d'état, planned and executed by the Committee of Safety, mostly foreign-born residents in Honolulu, whose goal was the annexation of Hawaii by the United States.

Cabinet ministers January 29, 1891 – January 17, 1893

See also
Cabinet of the Kingdom of Hawaii
Kalākaua's Cabinet Ministers
1892 Legislative Session of the Kingdom of Hawaii
Liliʻuokalani's Privy Council of State
MOS Hawaii-related articles

References

Bibliography

Further reading

"A List of All the Cabinet Ministers Who Have Held Office in the Hawaiian Kingdom"
 
37 pages relating to the Bayonet Constitution
 

Members of Cabinet of the Hawaiian Kingdom
House of Kalākaua
Members of the Hawaiian Kingdom House of Nobles
Members of the Hawaiian Kingdom Privy Council
Overthrow of the Hawaiian Kingdom
People associated with the overthrow of the Hawaiian Kingdom